Assael is a surname. Notable people with this surname include:
Jacqueline Assaël (born 1957), French academic
John Assael (born 1950), British architect
Marc J. Assael (born 1954), Greek chemical engineer
Shaun Assael (born 1962), American journalist
Steven Assael (born 1957), American painter